Esmeralda is a genus of beetles in the family Cerambycidae, containing the following species: Species of the genus Esmeralda are found in the Guianas and Brazil.

 Esmeralda coerulea (Schoenherr, 1817)
 Esmeralda costulata Bates, 1891
 Esmeralda laetifica Bates, 1869
 Esmeralda polita (Fragoso & Monné, 1988)

References

Prioninae